Antuco Hydroelectric Plant  is a hydroelectric power station in Bío Bío Region, Chile. The plant uses water from Laja River and produces  of electricity.

References

Energy infrastructure completed in 1981
Energy infrastructure in Biobío Region
Hydroelectric power stations in Chile